Valeriane "Valeri" Sarava (born January 16, 1978) is a retired male weightlifter from Georgia. He qualified for the 2000 Summer Olympics in Sydney, Australia, where he ended up in 16th place in the men's super heavyweight division (+ 105 kg). He stayed in Australia, took out Australian citizenship, and won a silver medal in the men's heavyweight division (105 kg) at the 2006 Commonwealth Games in Melbourne.

Major results

References

External links
 

1978 births
Living people
Male weightlifters from Georgia (country)
Olympic weightlifters of Georgia (country)
Weightlifters at the 2000 Summer Olympics
Weightlifters at the 2006 Commonwealth Games
Commonwealth Games silver medallists for Australia
Commonwealth Games medallists in weightlifting
Australian male weightlifters
Medallists at the 2006 Commonwealth Games